The Ch'ŏnsŏng T'an'gwang Line, or Ch'ŏnsŏng Colliery Line is an electrified standard-gauge freight-only secondary line of the Korean State Railway in South P'yŏngan Province, North Korea, running from Sinch'ang on the P'yŏngra Line to Ch'ŏnsŏng.

History
The line was originally opened by the Chosen Government Railway in 1936. After the partition of Korea, it was located entirely within the north, and it was part of the first section of line electrified by the Korean State Railway in 1946, between Yangdŏk on the P'yŏngra Line to Ch'ŏnsŏng via Sinch'ang. This electrification was destroyed during the Korean War, but in 1958 the Ch'ŏnsŏng–Sinch'ang–Kowŏn section was re-electrified.

Route
A yellow background in the "Distance" box indicates that section of the line is not electrified.

References

Railway lines in North Korea
Standard gauge railways in North Korea